Abenójar is a municipality in Ciudad Real Province, Castile-La Mancha, Spain. It has a population of 1,592.

Municipalities in the Province of Ciudad Real